Research Cave, also known as the Arnold Research Cave and the Saltpetre Cave, and designated by the Smithsonian trinomial 23CY64, is a major Native American archaeological site near Portland, Missouri.  Investigation of the site has uncovered evidence of human habition as far back as 8,000 years.  The site was designated a National Historic Landmark in 1964; it has been recommended for de-designation due to looting.

Description
The cave is substantially more than a rock shelter, with interior chambers accessible by low passages. When white settlers moved to the area in the early 19th century, one of them, John Phillips, began mining saltpetre from the cave for the manufacture of gunpowder. A later long-term owner was H.A. Arnold, giving the cave the name by which it is most commonly known. It has been the subject of archaeological interest since the mid-1950s, with intermixed materials that date back an estimate seven to ten thousand years. Finds at the cave are particularly notable for fine examples of footwear. The cave has produced several of North America's oldest human clothing finds including a pair of leather wrapped moccasins dating back 5,500 years ago. The site has been repeatedly disturbed, both by burrowing animals, and previously laid layers of cultural materials have been disturbed by subsequent occupants of the cave. By the early 1980s alterations to deposits at the cave mouth by the property owner had compromised some of the materials.

See also
List of National Historic Landmarks in Missouri
National Register of Historic Places listings in Callaway County, Missouri

References

National Historic Landmarks in Missouri
Landforms of Callaway County, Missouri
Archaeological sites on the National Register of Historic Places in Missouri
Caves of Missouri
National Register of Historic Places in Callaway County, Missouri
Cave research